Tartar may refer to:

Places 
 Tartar (river), a river in Azerbaijan
 Tartar, Switzerland, a village in the Grisons
 Tərtər, capital of Tartar District, Azerbaijan
 Tartar District, Azerbaijan
 Tartar Island, South Shetland Islands, Antarctica

People and languages
 Tartar, someone from Tartary, the historical central Asian region populated by Manchus, Mongols, Turks, and others
 Tatars, a Turkic ethnic group native to present-day Russia and Ukraine
 Tatar language

Chemicals 
 Potassium bitartrate, also called cream of tartar
 Tartaric acid, commonly mixed with sodium bicarbonate and sold as baking powder

Food 
 Steak tartare, a meat dish made from raw ground (minced) beef or horsemeat
 Tartar sauce, a condiment primarily composed of mayonnaise and finely chopped capers
 Cream of Tartar, the culinary name for potassium bitartrate, a dry, powdery, acidic byproduct of fermenting grapes into wine

Military 
 Tartar (1813 privateer), an American privateer schooner during the War of 1812
 HMS Tartar, the name of several Royal Navy Vessels
 RIM-24 Tartar, a missile
 Tartar Guided Missile Fire Control System

Transportation 
 Tartar, a GWR Iron Duke Class locomotive built 1848
 Tartar, a GWR 3031 Class locomotive built 1895

Other uses 
 Tartar (horse), a racehorse
 Commander Tartar, the antagonist of the Splatoon 2 Octo Expansion
 Dental tartar or calculus, hardened dental plaque
 Tartar Sauce, a swear word for SpongeBob SquarePants
 Wayne State Tartars, now called the Warriors
 Tartarus, in Greek mythology, a place in the underworld

See also 
 East Tartary
 Lake Tharthar
 Tartary
 Tatra (disambiguation)

Language and nationality disambiguation pages